Doto rosea is a species of sea slug, a nudibranch, a marine gastropod mollusc in the family Dotidae.

Distribution
This species was described from Genova, Italy, Mediterranean Sea.

Description
The body of this nudibranch is mostly transparent whitish in colour with brown or black dots forming a marbled pattern on the back and sides. There is a conspicuous black mark in the base of each ceras. The ceratal tubercles are slightly swollen and globular and the digestive gland is pink.

EcologyDoto rosea has been reported to feed on colonies of the hydroid, Eudendrium'' sp. (family Eudendriidae).

References

Dotidae
Gastropods described in 1881